Quench USA Inc is a water technology company that rents and services filtered water coolers. According to the site, over half of the Fortune 500 are customers. Zenith International lists Quench as a leading distributor in the point-of-use (POU) market along with Macke Water Systems and Nestle Waters. Quench is an independent operating company of AquaVenture Holdings. Quench is headquartered in King of Prussia, Pennsylvania. Quench was named an Online Marketing Success Story in Google's 2011 Economic Impact Report. In 2008, Quench was named a top 25 most successful startup by Businessweek.

Products description
Filtered water systems are plumbed into a building's water supply and purified at the last possible point before consumption. Filter water coolers and ice dispensers typically use carbon filtration, UV water disinfection and/or reverse osmosis to purify drinking water.

Acquisitions
In March 2012, Quench purchased Aqua Perfect of Arizona LLC.

In April 2014, Quench acquired Macke Water Systems.

In June 2014, Quench acquired Atlas Watersystems.

In July 2015, Quench acquired Region-X LLC a Massachusetts company that provides services related to high purity water systems 

In December 2018, Quench acquired Bluline, a point-of-use water filtration dealer and distributor based in South Florida.

References

Companies based in Montgomery County, Pennsylvania
Companies with year of establishment missing